James Philip Gray (born 26 June 1992) is a semi-professional footballer who plays as a striker for  club Frickley Athletic.

A former Middlesbrough youth player, he began his career with Darlington in the 2011–12 season. He moved on to Kettering Town in March 2012, before transferring to Accrington Stanley four months later.

He has represented Northern Ireland at under-16, under-17, under-19 and under-21 levels.

Early and personal life
Gray was born in Yarm, North Yorkshire, and is the son of former footballer Phil. Gray was arrested on 29 October 2015 and charged with drink-driving whilst on the way to training at Wrexham. He was charged at Chester Magistrates Court on 20 November 2015. His story was featured in an episode of Channel 4 series 999: What's Your Emergency?.

Club career
Gray started his career in the youth system at Middlesbrough in 2007, before being released in May 2011 at the end of his three-year apprenticeship. He signed for Conference Premier club Darlington in October 2011 on non-contract terms. He left the club by mutual consent in January 2012. He moved from one crisis club to another, signing for Kettering Town in March 2012 on non-contract terms.

Gray signed a one-year contract with League Two club Accrington Stanley in August 2012, following a successful trial spell. He made a scoring debut at the Crown Ground on 21 August, replacing Pádraig Amond on 82 minutes; he scored a stoppage time goal to secure a 2–0 win over Port Vale.

On 6 March 2015, he joined Accrington's League Two rivals Northampton Town on loan until the end of the 2014–15 season.

On 20 October 2017, Gray joined National League North club York City on a 28-day loan. He signed for York permanently on 7 November 2017 on a contract until the end of 2017–18. Gray joined York's divisional rivals Tamworth on 16 February 2018 on a one-month loan. He made his debut the following day as a 55th-minute substitute in a 2–2 draw at home to A.F.C. Telford United. Gray finished the loan with five appearances. He scored one goal from 20 appearances as York finished 2017–18 in 11th place in the table. He was released at the end of the season.

Gray signed for Northern Premier League Division One East club Frickley Athletic on 17 May 2018.

International career
Gray has been capped by Northern Ireland at under-16, under-17 and under-19 levels. He scored on his debut for the under-21 team, in a 3–2 defeat to Hungary on 15 August 2012. Gray made 11 appearances for the under-21s from 2012 to 2014, scoring twice.

Career statistics

References

External links

James Gray profile at the Frickley Athletic F.C. website
James Gray profile at the Irish Football Association website

1992 births
Living people
People from Yarm
Footballers from County Durham
Footballers from North Yorkshire
English footballers
Association footballers from Northern Ireland
Northern Ireland youth international footballers
Northern Ireland under-21 international footballers
Association football forwards
Middlesbrough F.C. players
Darlington F.C. players
Kettering Town F.C. players
Accrington Stanley F.C. players
Vauxhall Motors F.C. players
Northampton Town F.C. players
Wrexham A.F.C. players
Southport F.C. players
Glenavon F.C. players
Torquay United F.C. players
York City F.C. players
Tamworth F.C. players
Frickley Athletic F.C. players
National League (English football) players
English Football League players
NIFL Premiership players
English people of Northern Ireland descent